West Grove is a road in Roath, Cardiff, Wales. It is situated off Newport Road.  The Queen's Buildings of Cardiff University, Kings Monkton School and the former West Grove Unitarian Church are all located in West Grove.  The Mansion House is officially in Richmond Road, but it is at the extreme end of West Grove and dominates the northern end.

History
West Grove was one of the villa-lined roads that formed the wealthy residential district of Tredegarville, laid out for the Tredegar Estate during the third quarter of the nineteenth century.

Important buildings on West Grove

Grade II listed structures with the official names

Other important buildings

Kings Monkton School was established in 1870, and is an independent day school.

The GMB trade union has its Wales & South West regional office at Garley House.

See also 

 Transport in Cardiff

Notes 

Roads in Cardiff
Roath